Structured Disasters is the third full-length records for the Leeds-based band Hood.  The LP version was released in 1996 and the CD version was released in 1997.  Both versions are on the Happy Go Lucky Records label.  The LP version came with a 7" record.

Track listing

References

External links 
Hood Homepage
Happy Go Lucky Records

1996 albums
1997 albums
Hood (band) albums